Deli Jovan (Serbian Cyrillic: Дели Јован) is a mountain in eastern Serbia, near the town of Negotin. On the top of the mountain, there is a TV tower.

References

Mountains of Serbia
Serbian Carpathians